Fleeing the Trap (Farar az Taleh) is a 1971 Iranian action romance film directed by Jalal Moghadam and starring Behrouz Vossoughi, Davoud Rashidi, Jalal Pishvaeian and Shahin Khalili (Niloofar).

References

1971 films
1970s action drama films
1970s romantic thriller films
1970s Persian-language films
Romantic action films
Iranian romance films
Iranian black-and-white films